Glyphonyx is a genus of click beetles in the family Elateridae. There are at least 50 described species in Glyphonyx.

Species
These 51 species belong to the genus Glyphonyx:

 Glyphonyx ami Kishii, 1991 g
 Glyphonyx apayao Kishii, 1991 g
 Glyphonyx arisanus Miwa, 1931 g
 Glyphonyx atayal Kishii, 1991 g
 Glyphonyx bimarginatus Schaeffer, 1916 b
 Glyphonyx brevistylus Smith & Balsbaugh, 1984 b
 Glyphonyx brunneipennis Miwa, 1931 g
 Glyphonyx cariei (Fleutiaux, 1920) g
 Glyphonyx castaneus Miwa, 1931 g
 Glyphonyx chiapasensis Zaragoza-Caballero, 1990 g
 Glyphonyx chipenensis Kishii, 1994 g
 Glyphonyx exilis Kishii, 1991 g
 Glyphonyx ferruginosus Schaeffer, 1916 b
 Glyphonyx flavicollis Kishii, 1991 g
 Glyphonyx formosanus Ohira, 1972 g
 Glyphonyx fuscicollis Kishii, 1991 g
 Glyphonyx grossus Kishii, 1994 g
 Glyphonyx helix Smith & Balsbaugh b
 Glyphonyx housaii Kishii, 1991 g
 Glyphonyx inquinatus (Say, 1834) b
 Glyphonyx kankaui Miwa, 1931 g
 Glyphonyx kintaroui Kishii, 1991 g
 Glyphonyx knulli Smith & Balsbaugh, 1984 b
 Glyphonyx kulashi Smith & Balsbaugh, 1984 b
 Glyphonyx kuni Platia & Schimmel, 2007 g
 Glyphonyx laszlorum Platia & Schimmel, 2007 g
 Glyphonyx liukuiensis Kishii, 1989 g
 Glyphonyx longicornis Kishii, 1989 g
 Glyphonyx longipennis Ohira, 1966 g
 Glyphonyx longulus Miwa, 1930 g
 Glyphonyx marginalis Kishii, 1994 g
 Glyphonyx mimeticus Horn, 1874 b
 Glyphonyx muneaka Kishii, 1991 g
 Glyphonyx nanus Fleutiaux, 1940 b
 Glyphonyx nitidicollis Kishii, 1991 g
 Glyphonyx occidentalis g
 Glyphonyx oiwakensis Kishii, 1991 g
 Glyphonyx paiwan Kishii, 1991 g
 Glyphonyx parallelaris Kishii, 1991 g
 Glyphonyx quietus (Say, 1839) b
 Glyphonyx recticollis (Say, 1823) b
 Glyphonyx rubiginosus Kishii, 1991 g
 Glyphonyx rubricollis Miwa, 1928 g
 Glyphonyx rufithorax Kishii, 1991 g
 Glyphonyx sauteri Miwa, 1931 g
 Glyphonyx shirozuanus Kishii, 1991 g
 Glyphonyx taiwan Kishii, 1991 g
 Glyphonyx taiwanus Kishii, 1991 g
 Glyphonyx takasago Kishii, 1989 g
 Glyphonyx testaceus (Melsheimer, 1845) b
 Glyphonyx vunun Kishii, 1991 g

Data sources: i = ITIS, c = Catalogue of Life, g = GBIF, b = Bugguide.net

References

Further reading

External links

 

Elaterinae